Carondelet Farm  is a horse racing operation and breeding farm in Ramona, California near San Diego. The property was named after Carondelet Street in New Orleans.  

Carondelet Farm has raced and/or bred a number of Graded and Group Stakes Winners including Champion racehorse Artax who won the 1999 Breeders' Cup Sprint.

External links
About Carondelet Farm

Farms in California
Buildings and structures in San Diego County, California
Horse farms in the United States